St. Patrick Cathedral is the seat of the Roman Catholic Diocese of El Paso, Texas.  The cathedral is located at 1118 N. Mesa Street, north of the downtown area.  It is the mother church for 668,000 Catholics in the diocese (80.8% of total population; as of the 2006 survey). The cathedral parish operates one of El Paso's Catholic high schools, Cathedral High School, and St. Patrick Elementary School adjacent to the church.

History
The church was designed by Barnett, Haynes & Barnett, an architectural firm from St Louis, Missouri.  It was built in the form of a Byzantine basilica, in the Italian Renaissance style.  In raising funds for the cathedral's construction, the diocese offered to allow the first group to raise $10,000 for the project to name the new cathedral. A group of Irish Catholic women met the challenge and chose St. Patrick as patron. At the time El Paso was a major center of the mining industry in the southwestern United States and northern Mexico, with many of the miners being Irish.  The ground was broken on April 8, 1914 and the church and the cornerstone were blessed in a ceremony by Fr Edward Barry on November 12, 1916.  The interior of the cathedral is adorned with Roman columns, elaborate frescoes that depict biblical scenes and the Stations of the Cross are carved in bas-relief on the interior walls.  The high altar contains a 2.5-meter-tall statue of the Sacred Heart of Jesus with a large canopy over the altar, topped with a golden eagle.  The church seats about 800 people for Mass. In alcoves along the walls there are a picture of Our Lady of Guadalupe and a life-size classical sculpture of St. Patrick.  The stained-glass windows depict scenes from the life of Jesus and the Church.

Saint Peter of Jesus Maldonado and the Cathedral

Because of the anticlerical laws due to the Mexican Constitution of 1917 and the Mexican Revolution, the Catholic Church was increasingly suppressed by the governments of Presidents Alvaro Obregon and Plutarco Calles. Involvement in politics, freedom of worship and redress of grievances were severely curtailed and even denied to bishops, priests, deacons and Catholic laity.  Even prior to the end of the revolution, from 1914 to 1918, those aspiring to be priests found it impossible to study in Mexico, and studied abroad, usually in the United States, mostly in cities close to the U.S.-Mexican border.

El Paso was especially popular because of its closeness to Mexico.  During these years many seminarians from northern Mexico studied in El Paso, and were ordained to the priesthood there.  One such was Peter of Jesus Maldonado, who was ordained by Bishop Anthony J Schuler, S.J., in the cathedral on January 25, 1918.  Padre Maldonado returned to his native Chihuahua; he was beaten to death in 1937 at the hands of town authorities in Santa Isabel (at that time named General Trias), Chihuahua, for preaching the Gospel and teaching the catechism to the people there.  He was buried in the Cathedral of Chihuahua, and canonised by Pope John Paul II on May 21, 2000 as one of the companions of St Christopher Magallanes.  A memorial in the nave of St. Patrick commemorates the event of his ordination.

Photo Gallery I - The Windows

Photo Gallery II - Other Points of Interest

See also
List of Catholic cathedrals in the United States
List of cathedrals in the United States

References

Also included in the Borderlands series is additional information concerning El Paso and the cathedral.

External links
 Official Cathedral Site
 Roman Catholic Diocese of El Paso Official Site

 Site in Spanish.
 Site in English.
 "Cathedral's Beauty Pleases" . Borderlands: An El Paso Community College Project. Site in English.

Patrick El Paso
Buildings and structures in El Paso, Texas
Roman Catholic churches completed in 1916
Irish-American history and culture in Texas
Religion in El Paso, Texas
Tourist attractions in El Paso, Texas
20th-century Roman Catholic church buildings in the United States